Albert William 'Bob' Austen (24 May 1914 – 6 July 1999) was an Australian rules footballer who played with Hawthorn in the Victorian Football League (VFL).

After six games with Hawthorn in 1942, he enlisted and served in both in the Australian Army and the Royal Australian Air Force during World War II.

Notes

External links 

1914 births
1999 deaths
Australian rules footballers from Melbourne
Hawthorn Football Club players
Camberwell Football Club players
Australian Army personnel of World War II
Royal Australian Air Force personnel of World War II
Australian Army soldiers
Royal Australian Air Force airmen
Military personnel from Melbourne
People from Burnley, Victoria